Gharbia is a village in the commune of Hassani Abdelkrim, in Debila District, El Oued Province, Algeria.

References

Populated places in El Oued Province